Tephritomyia caliginosa is a species of tephritid or fruit flies in the genus Tephritomyia of the family Tephritidae.

Distribution
Cameroon.

References

Tephritinae
Insects described in 1942
Diptera of Africa